Staryi Yarychiv is a community in Lviv Raion, Lviv Oblast, Ukraine. It belongs to Novyi Yarychiv settlement hromada, one of the hromadas of Ukraine. Population 1746 people.

Until 18 July 2020, Staryi Yarychiv belonged to Kamianka-Buzka Raion. The raion was abolished in July 2020 as part of the administrative reform of Ukraine, which reduced the number of raions of Lviv Oblast to seven. The area of Kamianka-Buzka Raion was split between Chervonohrad and Lviv Raions, with Staryi Yarychiv being transferred to Lviv Raion.

The Yarych Confectionery factory is located here.

References

External links
 Weather in Staryi Yarychiv
Новий і Старий Яричеви

Villages in Lviv Raion